The , which is often abbreviated as , is a Japanese language daily newspaper published mainly in Hokkaidō, Japan by . As of June 2022, its morning edition has a circulation of 8,40,000. It was first published in Sapporo in 1887.

See also
liberalism in Japan

References

Further reading

External links
 

1887 establishments in Japan
Daily newspapers published in Japan
Mass media in Sapporo
Newspapers established in 1887
Japanese-language newspapers